"Hold On Tight" is a song written and performed by Electric Light Orchestra (ELO). The song is track twelve on the band's 1981 album Time and was the first song released as a single. The song went top ten in most countries, hitting the top spot in Spain and Switzerland, number two in Germany, number four in the UK, and number ten on the US Billboard Hot 100, becoming the band's seventh and last top 10 hit, as well as number two on the US Billboard Top Tracks chart the week of 12 September 1981. A verse sung in French, which is a reprise of the first verse, translates as "Hold on to your dream, Hold on to your dream, When you see your ship leaving, When you feel your heart breaking, Hold on to your dream".

Music video
At the time, the song's music video was the most expensive ever made, with a budget of approximately £40,000. The mostly black and white video features footage of ELO playing the song in a lounge, intercut with scenes in the style of 1940s serial films featuring the band members, including violinist Mik Kaminski, who was no longer a band member nor had actually played on this song, "playing" a guitar.

Critical reaction
Billboard called it an "affectionate tip-of-the-hat to '50s rock 'n' roll" that was inspired by "Jerry Lee Lewis' pumping piano style." Record World said it has "rockabilly lead vocals, soaring Beach Boys harmonies, patented ELO keyboard waves, and a good time for all."

In its review of the album. Rolling Stone said that with its "synthesized rock & roll cellos" the song is an "all-weather [single] for the here and now," but reviewing the album as a whole, Rolling Stone expressed concern that "If ELO's not careful, they're going to end up becoming the kind of cheese that squirts out of an aerosol can."

Uses in other media
The song was the theme song for the National Coffee Association's "Join the Coffee Achievers" television commercials which ran in 1983 and 1984.

The song was used in the Daicon III and IV Opening Animations.

The song is used as the theme to Michael Brown's radio talk programs The Situation which is heard on KHOW radio in Denver, Colorado, and The Weekend which is nationally syndicated by Premiere Networks.

Chart performance

Weekly charts

Year-end charts

See also
List of number-one singles of 1982 (Spain)
List of number-one singles of the 1980s (Switzerland)

References

1981 singles
1981 songs
Alvin and the Chipmunks songs
Electric Light Orchestra songs
Jet Records singles
Number-one singles in Spain
Number-one singles in Switzerland
British rock-and-roll songs
Song recordings produced by Jeff Lynne
Songs written by Jeff Lynne
Franglais songs